The 2019 3. divisjon (referred to as Norsk Tipping-ligaen for sponsorship reasons) was a fourth-tier Norwegian football league season. The league consisted of 84 teams divided into 6 groups of 14 teams each and began on 13 April 2019.

The league was played as a double round-robin tournament, where all teams played 26 matches.

Team changes 
The following teams have changed division since the 2018 season.

To 3. divisjon
Promoted from 4. divisjon
 24 teams

Relegated from 2. divisjon
 Nybergsund
 Hønefoss
 Stabæk 2
 Fløy
 Vålerenga 2
 Vard Haugesund

From 3. divisjon
Promoted to 2. divisjon
 Oppsal
 Kvik Halden
 Sola
 Sotra
 Byåsen
 Senja

Relegated to 4. divisjon
 24 teams

League tables

Group 1

Group 2

Group 3

Group 4

Group 5

Group 6

Top scorers

References

Norwegian Third Division seasons
3
Norway
Norway